Christian Holmes (born September 14, 1997) is an American football cornerback for the Washington Commanders of the National Football League (NFL). He played college football at Missouri and Oklahoma State and was selected by the Commanders in the seventh round of the 2022 NFL Draft.

High school and college
Holmes played cornerback and wide receiver for McNair High School in Atlanta, Georgia. He would commit to play college football at the University of Missouri.

Missouri Tigers
As a true freshman for the Missouri Tigers, he played minimally in 10 games and recorded only a single tackle. He would redshirt his second season due to a shoulder injury in a pre-season scrimmage. He played in 13 games as a redshirt sophomore and started eight, recording 12 pass break-ups and two interceptions, one of which he returned for a touchdown. Holmes would transfer to Oklahoma State in February 2020.

Oklahoma State Cowboys
In his first season with Oklahoma State, Holmes would play in all 11 games and started the final 2. He had 25 total tackles, and 6 broken-up passes. He would start 13 games in his final collegiate season, including the 2021 Big 12 Championship Game, and was named to the All-Big 12 second-team by the Associated Press while also receiving All-Big 12 Academic honors. Holmes finished the season with 39 tackles, an interception, and seven pass-breakups.

Professional career
Holmes was selected by the Washington Commanders in the seventh round (240th overall) of the 2022 NFL Draft. He signed his four-year rookie contract on May 6, 2022.

In Week 6 against the Chicago Bears, Holmes made a key special teams play in the fourth quarter when he recovered a muffed punt by Chicago returner Velus Jones Jr. on the Bears 6-yard line. This would lead to the Commanders' only touchdown in their 12-7 victory over the Bears.

References

External links
 
 Washington Commanders bio
 Oklahoma State Cowboys bio
 Missouri Tigers bio

Living people
Oklahoma State Cowboys football players
People from Leland, Mississippi
Missouri Tigers football players
Players of American football from Mississippi
American football cornerbacks
Washington Commanders players
1997 births